The Kendall Hotel, or The Kendall Hotel, is a boutique hotel on Main St. in the Kendall Square area of Cambridge, Massachusetts.  It repurposed a firehouse built in 1895: it was once the Engine 7 Firehouse.

The Telegraph's online review terms it a "gorgeous Victorian firehouse turned boutique hotel near buzzy Kendall Square" and asserts that its "Black Sheep restaurant is a gem."

It was originally designed to support horse-drawn fire-fighting equipment. It served in fire protection from 1895 to 1993, its role replaced by a modern fire station in Central Square.  The building was renovated starting in 2000.  Renovation involved moving the original three-story firehouse closer to the street, adding a seven-story tower behind, and restoring two cupolas.  After opening in 2002, it was expanded in 2007 with the addition of a second seven-story tower.

The hotel is a member of the Historic Hotels of America.

The owners have been honored by the Cambridge Historical Commission for the quality of their historic preservation efforts.

The Washington Post in 2017 included "Kendall Hotel at the Engine 7 Firehouse" in a list of 23 American "hotel retrofits", as "part of a trend toward historic adaptive reuse that has travelers overnighting in former department stores, textile mills, an auto assembly plant and even a 19th-century jail.".

In 2018, Boeing was to become a tenant next door.

Notes

References

Historic Hotels of America
Hotels in Massachusetts
Cambridge, Massachusetts
Buildings and structures completed in 1895